Football is the second most popular sport in Nicaragua after baseball.

National team

League system

References

External links
 Football in Nicaragua - FIFA